The women's high jump event at the 2019 European Athletics U23 Championships was held in Gävle, Sweden, at Gavlehof Stadium Park on 12 and 13 July.

Medalists

Results

Qualification
12 July

Qualification rule: 1.89 (Q) or the 12 best results (q) qualified for the final.

Final
13 July

References

High jump
High jump at the European Athletics U23 Championships